The "Demo" Tape is the first and only mixtape released by American singer R. Kelly in June 2009. The mixtape originally was to keep fans over until Kelly's forthcoming album was released. Hosted by DJ Drama and DJ Skee and released under each of their mixtape brands, Gangsta Grillz and Skeetox. R. Kelly remixes several popular R&B/Hip-Hop songs and performs some original songs as well.

Reception

The mixtape received mixed reviews by critics and fans alike. R&B singer and longtime Kelly fan  Trey Songz released a diss track, "Death of Autotune (R. Kelly Diss)", a freestyle of Jay-Z's "D.O.A." In the song, Trey expressed his disappointment in R. Kelly's use of the auto-tune effect throughout the mixtape. He also explained on his blog that he also disliked the use of it on Kelly's previous album, Double Up. He ended by saying, "If throwing rocks at the throne wakes up the King, consider them thrown. I just want R. Kelly back..." Chris Brown has stated this mixtape as an influence to his own debut mixtape.

Track listing

References

2009 mixtape albums
R. Kelly albums